How to Train Your Dragon (abbreviated HTTYD) is an American media franchise from DreamWorks Animation and loosely based on the eponymous series of children's books by British author Cressida Cowell. It consists of three feature films: How to Train Your Dragon (2010), How to Train Your Dragon 2 (2014) and How to Train Your Dragon: The Hidden World (2019). The franchise also contains five short films: Legend of the Boneknapper Dragon (2010), Book of Dragons (2010), Gift of the Night Fury (2011), Dawn of the Dragon Racers (2014) and How to Train Your Dragon: Homecoming (2019). A live-action reboot from Universal Pictures is in development and scheduled for release on March 14, 2025.

The television series based on the events of the first film, DreamWorks Dragons, began airing on Cartoon Network in September 2012. The first and second seasons were titled Dragons: Riders of Berk and Dragons: Defenders of Berk respectively. After the two seasons on Cartoon Network, the series was given the new title Dragons: Race to the Edge. The characters are older and it served as a prequel to the second film, running from June 2015 to February 2018. A second series, titled Dragons: Rescue Riders, began airing on Netflix in 2019 and features a completely different cast and locale than the original series of films and TV shows, but is set in the same universe. A third series, Dragons: The Nine Realms, began streaming on Hulu and Peacock in December 2021, with Rescue Riders transferring to Peacock beginning with the third season under the Heroes of the Sky subtitle. Unlike past entries in the franchise, The Nine Realms is set in the 21st century, specifically 1,300 years after the events of The Hidden World.

The franchise primarily follows the adventures of a young Viking named Hiccup Horrendous Haddock III (voiced by Jay Baruchel), son of Stoick the Vast, leader of the Viking island of Berk. Although initially dismissed as a clumsy and underweight misfit, he soon becomes renowned as a courageous expert in dragons, alongside Toothless, a member of the rare Night Fury breed as his flying mount and his closest companion. Together with his friends, he manages the village's allied dragon population in defense of his home as leader of a flying corps of dragon riders. Upon becoming leaders of their kind, Hiccup and Toothless are forced to make choices that will truly ensure peace between people and dragons. Dean DeBlois, the director of the film trilogy, described its story as "Hiccup's coming of age", taking place across a span of five years between the first and second film, and a year between the second and third film.

The film series has been highly acclaimed, with each film nominated for the Academy Award for Best Animated Feature, in addition to the first film's nomination for the Academy Award for Best Original Score.

Films

Original animated trilogy

How to Train Your Dragon (2010)

How to Train Your Dragon, the first film in the series, was released on March 26, 2010. It was directed by Dean DeBlois and Chris Sanders, and is inspired by the 2003 book of the same name by Cressida Cowell. The story takes place in a mythical Viking world where a young Viking teenager named Hiccup aspires to follow his tribe's tradition of becoming a dragon slayer. After finally capturing his first dragon, and with his chance of finally gaining the tribe's acceptance, he finds that he no longer has the desire to kill the dragon and instead befriends it. The film grossed nearly $500 million worldwide, and was nominated for the Academy Award for Best Animated Feature.

How to Train Your Dragon 2 (2014)

A sequel, How to Train Your Dragon 2, was confirmed on April 27, 2010. The film was written and directed by DeBlois, the co-director of the first film. Bonnie Arnold, the producer of the first film, also returned, with Sanders, who co-directed the first film, only exec-producing this time due to his involvement with The Croods and its sequel until the latter was delayed. The film was released on June 13, 2014. It was announced that the entire original voice cast – Baruchel, Butler, Ferguson, Ferrera, Hill, Mintz-Plasse, Miller and Wiig – would return for the sequel. New cast includes Kit Harington as Eret, Cate Blanchett as Valka, and Djimon Hounsou as Drago Bludvist. John Powell, the composer of the first film's score, returned for the second and third film.
Set five years after the events of the original film, Hiccup and Toothless have successfully united dragons and Vikings. Now 20 years old, Hiccup is pressed to succeed his father as chieftain. When he discovers a group of dragon trappers led by Drago Bludvist, he goes on a quest to find Drago, while also coming across his long-lost mother Valka.

How to Train Your Dragon: The Hidden World (2019)

In December 2010, DreamWorks CEO Jeffrey Katzenberg confirmed that there would also be a third film in the series: "How To Train Your Dragon is at least three: maybe more, but we know there are at least three chapters to that story." DeBlois, the writer, and director of the second and the third film, said that How to Train Your Dragon 2 is being intentionally designed as the second act of the trilogy: "There are certain characters and situations that come into play in the second film that will have to become much more crucial to the story by the third."

The film's release date was changed several times. In September 2012, 20th Century Fox and DreamWorks Animation announced an initial release date of June 18, 2016, which was later changed to June 16, 2016. It was then moved to June 9, 2017, and later to May 18, 2018, taking over the release date of Warner Animation Group's The Lego Movie 2: The Second Part. On December 5, 2016, the release date was pushed back again to March 2, 2019. This was the first DreamWorks Animation film to be distributed by Universal Pictures, after NBCUniversal's acquisition of the company in 2016, and followed DreamWorks' departure from 20th Century Fox after 2017's Captain Underpants: The First Epic Movie.
The film was produced by Arnold, and exec-produced by DeBlois and Sanders. Baruchel, Butler, Blanchett, Ferguson, Ferrera, Hill, Mintz-Plasse, Harington and Wiig reprised their roles from previous films. F. Murray Abraham joined the cast as the film's main villain, Grimmel.

Set one year after the events of the second film, Hiccup had become the new chieftain of Berk for dragons and Vikings. His late father had told a younger Hiccup to seek out the haven of dragons, known as "the Hidden World". Upon discovering a female Night Fury dragon, Toothless initiates a new bond with her. The Night Fury killer, Grimmel the Grisly, sets out to find and kill Toothless, prompting Hiccup to choose between keeping the dragons or letting them all go free.

Live-action reboot
A live-action film unrelated to the animated trilogy was announced to be in development. It will be produced by Marc Platt Productions and distributed by Universal Pictures, with Dean DeBlois set to return to write and direct. It is scheduled for release on March 14, 2025. It is also confirmed that composer John Powell will return to write the score for the live-action film.

Television series

DreamWorks Dragons (2012–2018) 

On October 12, 2010, it was announced that Cartoon Network had acquired worldwide broadcast rights to a weekly animated series based on the movie, which was scheduled to begin sometime in 2012. In January 2011, producer Tim Johnson confirmed that work had begun on the series and that, unlike the TV series spin-offs of the films Madagascar, Kung Fu Panda and Monsters vs. Aliens, How To Train Your Dragon'''s series is much darker and deeper, like the movie. The show is the first DreamWorks Animation series that airs on Cartoon Network instead of Nickelodeon, unlike previous series such as The Penguins of Madagascar, Kung Fu Panda: Legends of Awesomeness and Monsters vs. Aliens.

Although it was announced that the series would be called Dragons: The Series, TV promos shown in June 2012 revealed a new title – Dragons: Riders of Berk. The series began airing in the third quarter of 2012. John Sanford, the director of seven episodes in the first season, confirmed that there would also be a second season. Jay Baruchel, who voiced Hiccup, also stars in the series, as well as America Ferrera (Astrid), Christopher Mintz-Plasse (Fishlegs), and T. J. Miller (Tuffnut). The second season is accompanied with the new subtitle, Defenders of Berk, replacing the previous Riders of Berk subtitle. Starting with the third season, the series moved to Netflix and is accompanied by the subtitle Race to the Edge.

 DreamWorks Dragons: Rescue Riders (2019–2022) 

A preschool-oriented spin-off, DreamWorks Dragons: Rescue Riders was released on Netflix on September 27, 2019.

 DreamWorks Dragons: The Nine Realms (2021–present) 

On October 13, 2021, DreamWorks announced DreamWorks Dragons: The Nine Realms, set 1,300 years after The Hidden World. The six-episode series was released on Peacock and Hulu on December 23, 2021. The Nine Realms stars Jeremy Shada, and is executive produced by showrunner John Tellegen, Chuck Austen and Henry Gilroy.

Short films
Legend of the Boneknapper Dragon (2010)Legend of the Boneknapper Dragon is a 16 minute sequel short film to the feature film How to Train Your Dragon. The short was originally broadcast on television on October 14, 2010, on Cartoon Network, and released next day as a special feature on Blu-ray and double DVD edition of the original feature film.

The film follows Hiccup and his young fellows accompanying their mentor, Gobber, on a quest to kill the legendary Boneknapper Dragon. About half the film is done in traditional animation, showing Gobber's history and his encounters with the Boneknapper, and how he comes to look like he does now.

Book of Dragons (2011)Book of Dragons is an 18-minute short film, based on How to Train Your Dragon, and was released on November 15, 2011, on DVD and Blu-ray, along with Gift of the Night Fury. The short shows Hiccup, Astrid, Fishlegs, Toothless and Gobber telling the legend behind the Book of Dragons and revealing insider training secrets about new, never before seen dragons. The short shows a total of 14 different dragons, each separated into 7 classes: Stoker (Terrible Terror, Monstrous Nightmare), Boulder (Gronckle, Whispering Death), Fear (Hideous Zippleback, Snaptrapper), Sharp (Deadly Nadder, Timberjack), Tidal (Scauldron, Thunderdrum), Mystery (Changewing, Boneknapper) and Strike (Skrill, Night Fury).

Gift of the Night Fury (2011)Gift of the Night Fury is a 22-minute How to Train Your Dragon Christmas special, directed by Tom Owens. It was released on November 15, 2011, on DVD and Blu-ray, along with Book of Dragons.
Based on How to Train Your Dragon, the short takes place in the middle of preparing for the Viking winter holiday, 'Snoggletog', when suddenly all the dragons inexplicably go on a mass migration, except for Toothless, so Hiccup gives him something to help.

Dawn of the Dragon Racers (2014)

A 25-minute short film, titled Dawn of the Dragon Racers, was released on November 11, 2014, on the DVD/Blu-ray/digital release of How to Train Your Dragon 2. It was released on DVD separately on March 3, 2015, and it also includes Book of Dragons and Legend of the Boneknapper Dragon. It was directed by John Sanford and Elaine Bogan, and it features the voices of Jay Baruchel and America Ferrera along with the cast from the television series. In the short, a hunt for a lost sheep turns into a competition between Hiccup and his friends for the first title of Dragon Racing Champion of Berk.

How to Train Your Dragon: Homecoming (2019)How to Train Your Dragon: Homecoming is a 22-minute holiday special which aired on NBC on December 3, 2019. It is set ten years after the dragons left the Vikings in How to Train Your Dragon: The Hidden World, but within the film's epilogue. Hiccup and Astrid's children believe dragons are dangerous monsters after finding Stoick's old journals, leading Hiccup and Astrid to bring back the Snoggletog Pageant in order to convince them otherwise. Meanwhile, Toothless and the Light Fury's three Night Light children come to New Berk looking for Hiccup, prompting their parents to go after them.

Snoggletog Log (2019)Snoggletog Log is a 28-minute slow television short film inspired by The Yule Log; it is a single continuous 28-minute shot of a Christmas fireplace, with various gags involving the franchise's main characters, Viking and dragon alike, happening every so often. It has been available on Hulu since the 2019 holiday season.

Video games
 An action adventure video game released by Activision called How to Train Your Dragon was released for the Wii, Xbox 360, PS3 and Nintendo DS gaming consoles. It is loosely based on the film and was released on March 23, 2010.
 Super Star Kartz video game was released by Activision on November 15, 2011, for PlayStation 3, Xbox 360, Wii, Nintendo DS, and Nintendo 3DS. The game features 14 different characters from DreamWorks' films – How to Train Your Dragon, Madagascar, Shrek, and Monsters vs. Aliens.
 Dragons: TapDragonDrop, a mobile video game, developed by PikPok, was released on May 3, 2012, on App Store for iPhone, iPad and iPod Touch.
 Dragons: Wild Skies, a 3D virtual world game based on the television series DreamWorks Dragons has been launched on August 27, 2012, on CartoonNetwork.com. The game allows players to find, train and ride wild dragons, including new ones as they are introduced in the series.
 School of Dragons, a 3D educational massively multiplayer online role-playing game produced by JumpStart, game concept was co-created by Producer David Jaloza and Lead Designer Justin Prate was released online in July 2013, after a month-long beta testing. A Facebook version was released in October 2013, followed by an iPad app in December 2013, a version for Android-powered tablets in March 2014, and a version for the PC in 2014. In the game, each player is able to adopt, raise and train a dragon, while learning how they function.
 Dragons Adventure, an augmented reality game, was released in November 2013, exclusively for Nokia Lumia 2520.
 Dragons: Rise of Berk is a free game which allows players to build their own Berk village, send Hiccup and Toothless out on exploration, hatch and collect up to 30 dragons and train their own dragon at the academy. Developed by Ludia, it was released in May 2014 for iOS, and on June 20, 2014, for Android and Facebook.
 How to Train Your Dragon 2, an action adventure game, was released in June 2014 for Xbox 360, Nintendo 3DS, Wii, Wii U and PlayStation 3. The game was published by Little Orbit.
 Canadian developer Ludia announced Dragons: Titan Uprising in November 2018, for release in early 2019.Dragons: Dawn of New Riders, an action adventure game, developed by Climax Studios and released in 2019 for Xbox One, PlayStation 4, Nintendo Switch and PC. The game involves the playable characters Scribbler and Patch on their quest to defeat Eir, by exploring the world and its puzzle and battle elements.Dragons: Legends of the Nine Realms, an action adventure game, developed by Aheartfulofgames and released in 2022 for Xbox One, PlayStation 4, Nintendo Switch and PC.

Literature
Comic books
A series of comic books, titled Dragons: Riders of Berk, were released by Titan Comics, starting with the first volume, Dragon Down, on April 30, 2014. The comics were written by Simon Furman and drawn by Iwan Nazif. Other volumes are Dangers of the Deep (2014), The Ice Castle (2015), The Stowaway (2015), The Legend of Ragnarok (2015), and Underworld (2015). Two more comic books were published on February 24, 2016, titled Dragons: Defenders of Berk. The following volumes are The Endless Night (2016) and Snowmageddon (2016).

Graphic novels
Dark Horse Comics have released a series of graphic novels based on the franchise, starting with How to Train Your Dragon: The Serpent's Heir in 2016. The series was co-written by Dean DeBlois, writer and director of the film series, and Richard Hamilton, writer of Dragons: Race to the Edge, with the production designer of How to Train Your Dragon 2, Pierre-Olivier Vincent, providing cover artwork. The series took place between the events of second and third film, with the first novel picking up right after the conclusion of the second film.

Live performance
Ice show
A Broadway-style production titled How To Train Your Dragon On Ice is currently on Royal Caribbean's Allure of the Seas.

Arena showHow to Train Your Dragon Live Spectacular or How to Train Your Dragon Arena Spectacular is an arena show adaptation of the original film. The show is being produced in partnership with Global Creatures, the company behind another arena show Walking with Dinosaurs – The Arena Spectacular, and directed by Nigel Jamieson. The score was composed by John Powell and Jónsi from Sigur Rós. Arena Spectacular features 24 animatronic dragons – 10 different species in various sizes: Nadder, Gronckle, Monstrous Nightmare, Night Fury (Toothless), Red Death, Skrill, Stinger, Kite Dragon, Zippleback and Egg Biter. It also features villagers and Vikings, including Hiccup (Rarmian Newton/Riley Miner), Astrid (Sarah McCreanor/Gemma Nguyen), Stoick (Robert Morgan), and Gobber (Will Watkins).

The show premiered as How to Train Your Dragon Arena Spectacular on March 3, 2012, in Melbourne, Australia, and was followed by a New Zealand tour in April 2012. Renamed to How to Train Your Dragon Live Spectacular, it toured United States and Canada between June 2012 and January 2013, when it was cancelled in favour of taking the show to China where it premiered in July 2014. It was also planned to come to England but was later scrapped due to an increase in market demand in China.

Theme parks
Heide Park
In 2016, the German theme park Heide Park created a whole section of the park offering various rides based on the franchise called "How to Train Your Dragon: The Island". It offers three different flying attractions and a boat ride where guests venture into the dark Dragon Caves to meet and help Hiccup, Toothless and their friends.

Motiongate Dubai
The Dubai Hollywood-inspired theme park Motiongate Dubai also features a section of the park based on the films and television series. The most prominent attraction is the hanging roller coaster named "Dragon Gliders". Riders join Hiccup, Toothless, Astrid, and Stormfly in flying through the caves of the Forbidden Island, where they come across an unexpected threat. Guests can also meet and greet with Hiccup, Toothless, and Astrid.

Universal Studios
To promote How to Train Your Dragon: The Hidden World, Universal Studios Florida briefly had a limited-time virtual reality experience where guests could experience riding on Toothless, while Universal Studios Hollywood allowed visitors to meet and greet with Toothless. Universal Studios Beijing's Hollywood Boulevard area contains Untrainable, an immersive How to Train Your Dragon-themed stage show with largescale puppets and sets.

 DreamWorks Water Park 
A Proslide KrakenRACER mat racing slide called Dragon Racers opened at DreamWorks Water Park at American Dream in East Rutherford, New Jersey on October 1, 2020, along with a Proslide and the world's tallest and longest hydromagnetic water coaster called Toothless Trickling Torpedo.

 Reception 
 Box office 
Having earned over $1.6 billion worldwide, How to Train Your Dragon'' is the 13th highest-grossing animated franchise.

Critical and public response

Accolades
The franchise was nominated for the Academy Award for Best Animated Feature, the Critics' Choice Movie Award for Best Animated Feature, and the Golden Globe Award for Best Animated Feature Film.

Recurring cast and characters

Additional crew and production details

References

External links

 
 DreamWorks Animation's School of Dragons

 
Animated films about dragons
Animated film series
Computer-animated films
DreamWorks Animation franchises
Universal Pictures franchises
Universal Pictures
Film series introduced in 2010
Films set in the Viking Age
American animated fantasy films
Dragons in popular culture
Children's film series
Anime-influenced Western animation
Works set in the Viking Age